The Montreal Maroons were a Canadian ice hockey team based in Montreal, Quebec. The team was a member of the Canadian Division of the National Hockey League (NHL).

Table key

Year by year

See also
List of NHL seasons

Notes
Postseason statistics and results for the 1925–26 season include the 1926 Stanley Cup Finals which were contested by the NHL champion Maroons and Western Hockey League champion Victoria Cougars. These numbers are also included in the overall totals at the bottom of the table.

References

 
Montreal Maroons
seasons